Pedassaar is an island in the Gulf of Finland belonging to Estonia.

See also
Aksi
Koipsi
Malusi islands
Prangli
Rammu
Rohusi

Estonian islands in the Baltic
Kuusalu Parish
Gulf of Finland
Islands of Estonia